Antonio Vassilacchi (1556–1629), also called L'Aliense, was a Greek painter, who was active mostly in Venice and the Veneto.

Biography
Antonio Vassilacchi was born of Greek descent on the island of Milos, Greece in 1556. He left very young to settle in Venice.  In 1572 Vassilacchi became a pupil of Paolo Veronese and began working on the frescoes in the episcopal palace at Treviso, in the church of Sant'Agata in Padua (Padova), and various churches in Venice. His opportunity came with the great conflagration that nearly devoured the Doge's Palace in Venice in December 1577. Aliense, a compatriot and just a little younger than El Greco, was one of the painters commissioned to decorate the restored Palace.

Vassilacchi became a member of 'The Brotherhood of Saint Nicolas of the Greek Nation' (Scuola dei Greci), one of the liveliest 'foreign' communities in Venice, in 1600. In its book of members, the secretary inscribed, between a Cephallonian and a Cypriot, "Ant. Vassilachi: 1600:".  He was also a member of the Brotherhood of Venetian Painters from 1584 and had acquired a sobriquet, 'Aliense'. The name derives from the Latin alienus, meaning stranger, alien, foreign, and was presumably given to Vassilacchi because of his completely alien, that is non-Italian (and not simply non-Venetian), origin.

Vassilacchi married three times.  The name of his first wife, who bore him his son, Stefano, is not known. Stefano followed in his father's footsteps as a painter and is said to have helped him on the Coronation of Baldwin of Flanders.

He died young, however, before having established a career. Vassilacchi also had two daughters who entered the Nunnery of Santa Chiara (for which Vassilacchi had painted an Annunciation), though it is not known whether they were from his first or second marriage.  His second wife, Giacomina, made her will on November 2, 1609, and died six days later. Vassilacchi's last marriage was his most unfortunate. Carlo Ridolfi, his biographer and student, describes a painting by the artist in which he portrays himself carrying his wife, her nurse, her uncle and her son by her previous marriage, on his back.  Vassilacchi used to show this picture to his friends and say "This is the burden I'll bear till I die".

Aliense died on Easter's eve, 1629, in his seventy-third year.  He was buried with honours in the church of San Vitale two days later. San Vitale is the church on the same square as Vassilacchi's house and he had painted there, a few years earlier (and both aptly named), a Resurrection' and an Ascension.

His entry in the official Venetian register reads: 1629, 15 April. Sire Antonio Aliense, painter, aged about 73 years, sick of fever and catarrh these twelve days past. Among his pupils was Tomasso Dollobella.

Works

His works in the Doges' Palace likely outnumber those by any other single artist, since he painted in all the major halls of the Palace, such as the Hall of the Grand Council (Sala del Maggior Consiglio), the Voting Hall (Sala dello Scrutinio), the Hall of the Senate (Sala del Senato), the Hall of the Council of Ten (Sala del Consiglio dei Dieci), the Hall of the Compass (Sala della Bussola).

In 1586, Vassilacchi was asked to paint one of his largest pictures, the 'Resurrection', in the chancel of San Marziale.  He gave the preliminary sketch, in chiaroscuro, to Domenico Cresti, the painter of the Crucifixion in the same church. The paintings, restored in 1958, still hang in the same place, across from each other above the marble high altar of the church.

In 1591 Vassilacchi was engaged by the Brotherhood of Merchants (Scuola dei Mercanti), and some time later he was working in the church of San Giovanni Elemosinario, just a few metres from the commercial centre of Venice, the Rialto. He painted the Plague of Serpents (1588) in the Church of the Angelo San Raffaele. Behind the facade of the church of San Zaccaria, at least four large works by Aliense are preserved.

In 1559 the Benedictine monks of San Giorgio Maggiore decided to renovate their church.  They commissioned Palladio to execute the work but at the time of his death, twenty one years later, it was still unfinished. The abbot then summoned Vassilacchi to select the best, in his opinion, preliminary design for the central altar of the church. 
Naturally modest and polite, Aliense had a good word to say about all the sketches, which complicated rather than simplified matters. In the end, the up to then judge was asked to design something himself.  His sketch was immediately accepted and from it was created the large bronze group of the Four Evangelists Supporting the World and God.

In 1594, Aliense, recommended by the Benedictines of San Giorgio Maggiore, undertook to paint the circle of pictures that consist the Life of Christ'' for the church of San Pietro in Perugia, which belonged to the same Order. The ten paintings still survive in their original setting, together with his monumental "Apotheosis of the Benedictine Order" which, at 88 square metres (947 square feet), is the second biggest painting in Italy.
	
In 1602 Antonio Vassilacchi began painting in the cathedral church at Salò, while his surviving work—mainly decorative—in the Villa Barbarigo, of the senator Giovanni Barbarigo at Noventa Vicentina, near Montagnana, is impressive.

His last, in all probability, works are those painted in Santa Maria in Vanzo, Padua.

Gallery

References

External links

Aliense
Antonio Vassilacchi
 Antonio Vassilacchi

1556 births
1629 deaths
People from Milos
16th-century Italian painters
Italian male painters
17th-century Italian painters
Greek painters
Painters from Venice
Italian Mannerist painters
16th-century Greek people
17th-century Greek people
Venetian people of Greek descent
Italian people of Greek descent
16th-century Greek painters
17th-century Greek painters